Braud may refer to:

People 
 François Braud (b. 1986), French Nordic combined skier
 Martin Braud (b. 1982), French slalom canoer
 Pascal Braud (b. 1968), French footballer
 Wellman Braud (1891–1966), American jazz musician

Economy 
  Braud, Grape Harvester French manufacturer

Geography 
 Braud-et-Saint-Louis, commune in the Gironde department in Aquitaine in southwestern France